The 1989 World Junior Speed Skating Championships was held on March 3–5, 1989, at the Ice Stadium in Kyiv (Ukrainian SSR). The format of the competition was allround and medals were awarded for overall classification.

Calendar

Participating nations

Medal summary

Medal table

Medalists

Classifications

Men

Women

References

World Junior Speed Skating Championships
1989 in speed skating
1989
1989 in Ukrainian sport
Sports competitions in Kyiv
March 1989 sports events in Europe
1989 in youth sport